Alan Belen Fanhoni (born December 23, 1991) is a Brazilian baseball infielder.

He was selected for Brazil national baseball team at the 2013 World Baseball Classic Qualification, 2013 World Baseball Classic, 2019 Pan American Games Qualifier, and 2021 World Baseball Classic Qualifier.

References

External links
Baseball America

1991 births
Living people
Baseball infielders
Brazilian expatriate baseball players in Japan
Brazilian expatriate sportspeople in France
Sportspeople from São Paulo
2013 World Baseball Classic players